Zakabar (also Romanized as Z̄akābar and Zokābar) is a village in Jirandeh Rural District, Amarlu District, Rudbar County, Gilan Province, Iran. At the 2006 census, its population was 119, in 27 families.

References 

Populated places in Rudbar County